Huguenot Memorial Chapel and Monument is a historic church located at Manakin, Powhatan County, Virginia. Built in 1700 by French Huguenots, Protestant refugees, it was moved to its current location in 1710.  It burned down in the Revolutionary War and was later rebuilt with parts of the original building. It is in what is called the Carpenter Gothic style. A new church was built next to this in 1954, and is the one still currently used.

It was added to the National Register of Historic Places in 1988.

References

 

Churches on the National Register of Historic Places in Virginia
Carpenter Gothic church buildings in Virginia
Churches completed in 1895
Buildings and structures in Powhatan County, Virginia
National Register of Historic Places in Powhatan County, Virginia